Ricardo Alfredo Valiño (born 2 January 1971 in Buenos Aires) is an Argentine football coach.

Career 

Ricardo Valiño who never played professional football, started his career assisting Gabriel Orlando Rodriguez during his coaching stay with the academies of San Lorenzo, River Plate and Vélez Sarsfield.

He arrived at Venados at 2011, where he stayed until 2014, with a total of 104 games coached.

Since May 2014, started coaching BUAP. He was sacked in April 2016, after coaching a total of 80 games.

In April 2016 he was announced as new coach of Puebla of Liga MX.

On April 25, 2017, he was appointed manager of Celaya. On July 4, 2018, he was dismissed from the position after failing to obtain the requested results. 

On October 4, 2018 he was appointed as Manager of the Club Atlético Zacatepec.  In December 2019, he was runner-up in the Torneo Apertura 2019. On June 26, 2020, the transfer of Club Atlético Zacatepec to Morelia was announced, the team was renamed Atlético Morelia and Valiño continued with his position in the new team.

On March 14, 2023, was announced by the Venezuelan Football Federation as head coach of the venezuelan national teams U-20 and U-23 and internal head coach of the U-17 team to the South American U-17 Championship.

Managerial statistics

Honours

Manager
Atlético Morelia
Liga de Expansión MX: Clausura 2022

Footnotes

External links 
 Ficha en LigaMX.net

1971 births
Living people
Argentine football managers
Argentine expatriate football managers
Club Celaya managers
Club Puebla managers
Club Tijuana managers
Lobos BUAP managers
Argentine expatriate sportspeople in Mexico
Expatriate football managers in Mexico
Sportspeople from Buenos Aires